Plagiotremus iosodon is a species of combtooth blenny found in the western central Pacific ocean in the Philippines.

References

iosodon
Fish described in 1976